Canadian-Serbian relations are foreign relations between Canada and Serbia. Both countries established diplomatic relations in 1922 with the opening of a Consulate-General in Montreal. Canada has an embassy in Belgrade.  Serbia has an embassy in Ottawa and a general consulate in Toronto and 2 honorary consulates (in Montreal and Vancouver). There are around 150,000 people of Serbian descent living in Canada.

See also 
 Foreign relations of Canada
 Foreign relations of Serbia
 Canada-Yugoslavia relations

References

External links 
  Canadian Ministry of Foreign Affairs and International Trade about relations with Serbia
  Canadian embassy in Belgrade
  Serbian Ministry of Foreign Affairs about relations with Canada
  Serbian embassy in Ottawa
  Serbian general consulate in Toronto

 

Serbia 

Canada